Gymnastics at the 2015 Games of the Small States of Europe will take place 2–3 June 2015 at the Laugaból Ármann Gymnastic Hall in Reykjavík, Iceland.

Medal summary

Medal table

Medalists

Men's results

Team competition

Individual all-around

Floor

Pommel horse

Rings

Vault

Parallel bars

Horizontal bar

Women's results

Team competition

Individual all-around

Vault

Uneven bars

Balance beam

Floor

References
Gymnastics Results

External links

2015 Games of the Small States of Europe
2015 in gymnastics
Gymnastics at the Games of the Small States of Europe